= Tarik Ajouadi =

Moroccan footballer

Personal information
- Full name: Tarik Ajouadi
- Date of birth: April 12, 1988 (age 38)
- Place of birth: Casablanca, Morocco
- Height: 1.79 m (5 ft 10 1/2 in)
- Position: Midfielder

Team information
- Current team: Wydad Casablanca

Youth career
- ?–2007: Wydad Casablanca

Senior career*
Years	Team	Apps	(Gls)
2007–	Wydad Casablanca	82	(0)
- * Club domestic league appearances and goals as of April 16, 2009 ‡ National team caps and goals as of October 17, 2008

Tarik Ajouadi (born 12 April 1988 in Casablanca) is a Moroccan footballer, he is currently attached to Wydad Casablanca.
